Budaörs Handball is a Hungarian women's handball club, that plays in the Nemzeti Bajnokság I, the top level championship in Hungary. They played in the first division between 2015 and 2019, then they spent two seasons in the second division (Nemzeti Bajnokság I/B) before qualifying for the first league again in 2021.

Kits

Team

Current squad
Squad for the 2022–23 season

Goalkeepers
 1  Maja Bőle
 44  Flóra Varjas-Sipeki
 99  Ramóna Vártok
Wingers 
LW
 42  Laura Csenge Braun
 57  Melinda Tóth 
 54  Mercédesz Kiss
RW
 3  Krisztina Szabó-Májer
 19  Tamara Vártok

Line players
 8  Ágnes Szabadfi  
 15  Nóra Szép
 28  Lívia Nagy
 77  Lilia Gorilska

Back players  
Left backs
 20  Eszter Smid
 33  Anette Emma Hudák
Playmakers
 11  Vivien Zsigmond 
 23  Virág Bánfai
 30  Barbara Pálos-Bognár  
 36  Zsófia Mlinkó
Right backs
 9  Luca Szekerczés
 11  Éva Schneider
 67  Dalma Marik

Staff members 

 Head coach:  Dániel Buday
 Assistant coach:  Zoltán Pinizsi
 Goalkeeper coach:  Irina Sirina
 Professional director:  Ágnes Hornyák

Transfers
Transfers for the 2023–24 season

 Joining
  Kitty Mistina (GK) (from  Mosonmagyaróvári KC SE)
  Kinga Debreczeni-Klivinyi (LB) (from  Siófok KC)

 Leaving
  Flóra Varjas-Sipeki (GK) (retires)

Honours

Domestic competitions
Nemzeti Bajnokság I/B:
: 2013, 2015, 2021

Notable former players
  Ágnes Hornyák
  Szandra Szöllősi-Zácsik
  Barbara Pálos-Bognár
  Fruzsina Dávid-Azari
  Noémi Pásztor
  Viktória Soós
  Bernadett Bódi
  Jelena Agbaba

Head coach history

References

External links
  

Hungarian handball clubs
Handball clubs established in 2011
2011 establishments in Hungary
Sport in Pest County